Pádraig Murphy is a former Irish diplomat.

Murphy was born in Cork. He received a BA from UCC and an MA from Sheffield University.

In the Irish Department of Foreign Affairs and Trade he served as Ambassador to the USSR and Finland (1981-85), as Political Director of the department, (1985-91), Ambassador to the Federal Republic of Germany (1991-98), to Spain (1998-2001) and to Japan (2001-2005). He retired in 2005.

In 2012 he served as the OSCE Chairmanship's Special Representative for the South Caucasus.

Murphy chairs the Foreign Policy Group of the IIEA and is a member of its Germany Group.

He is a regular contributor to the Dublin Review of Books.

References

External links
  The Rules-Based Multilateral Order: A Rethink is Needed, Pádraig Murphy, March 2020.
  Germany's Role in EU Foreign Policy and the Challenge of Ukraine 20 May 2014

Alumni of University College Cork 
Ambassadors of Ireland to Finland
Ambassadors of Ireland to the Soviet Union
Ambassadors of Ireland to Germany
Ambassadors of Ireland to Spain
Ambassadors of Ireland to Japan